Guillermo Schickendantz is an Argentine field hockey player. He made his debut for the national team at the 2012 Men's Hockey Champions Challenge I,  at the age of 33.

References

External links

Living people
Argentine male field hockey players
Sportspeople from Córdoba, Argentina
Male field hockey forwards
South American Games gold medalists for Argentina
South American Games medalists in field hockey
Competitors at the 2014 South American Games
2014 Men's Hockey World Cup players
División de Honor de Hockey Hierba players
Club Egara players
Club de Campo Villa de Madrid players
Men's Belgian Hockey League players
1979 births